Sydney Gratien Adair Maartensz (14 April 1882 in Colombo, Sri Lanka – 10 September 1967 in Pyrford, Woking, Surrey, England) was an English cricketer. A right-handed batsman and wicket-keeper he played first-class cricket for Hampshire in 1919.

Before he played for Hampshire, Maartensz lived in Malaya, where he played for the Federated Malay States between 1909 and 1914, also playing for the Straits Settlements in matches against Hong Kong and Shanghai in 1909.

During the 1919 English cricket season, he played twelve first-class matches for Hampshire, all but one of them in the County Championship. He returned to play for the Federated Malay States in the 1920s, playing four times against the Straits Settlements and once against Hong Kong.

References

1882 births
1967 deaths
English cricketers
Federated Malay States cricketers
Straits Settlements cricketers
Hampshire cricketers
British people in British Ceylon
British people in British Malaya